The Blue Ridge two-lined salamander (Eurycea wilderae) is a species of salamander in the family Plethodontidae, endemic to the United States. This species is found in the southern Appalachian Mountains, mostly south of Virginia. To the north is a similar salamander, Eurycea bislineata, or the northern two-lined salamander. Its genus, Eurycea contains 33 species and includes taxa that have either a metamorphic life cycle or larval-form paedomorphosis. In species that metamorphose, there can be within-and among-population variation in larval life-history characteristics, e.g., duration of the larval period and size at metamorphosis. Intraspecific geographic variation in species of Eurycea has been attributed to several factors: temperature, stream order and productivity of the larval habitat. 

Adult Blue Ridge two-lined salamanders are commonly found near stream banks. The larvae are aquatic, living in streams and seeps. Its natural habitats are temperate forests, rivers, intermittent rivers, and freshwater springs. It is threatened by habitat loss. This species is named after zoologist Inez Whipple Wilder, who studied biology of Eurycea species.
These amphibians are listed by the IUCN as a species of least concern for conservation.

Reproduction 

The Blue Ridge two-lined salamander is an external fertilizer. Its oviposition usually occurs during late winter or early spring months.

Distribution and habitat 

The Blue Ridge two-lined salamanders have been reported to the southern Appalachian Mountain range (Sever 1920). Within those mountains they will be found along streams and forested habitat. The mating season will usually determine if they are discovered in more of a terrestrial or aquatic habitat. It is not well documented if this species migrates further than from teritestial to aquatic habitats. They are lungless and require environments that are moist and cool (Crawford 2016). The streams that are more suitable for the Blue Ridge two- lined salamander contain submerged substrate to oviposit. When this salamander is not breeding they will burrow, typically under logs and leaf litter.

Diet

Their diet is very similar to other terrestrial salamanders.  Both the aquatic juveniles and terrestrial adults have been documented eating copepods, midge larvae, nematodes, and both aquatic and terrestrial insects. The size of the prey items depends on the salamander's size and growth rate.

Predators 

Spring salamanders, garter snakes, black-bellied salamanders, and other larger plethodontids prey upon larval and adult Blue Ridge two-lined salamanders. The adults can use chemical sensing to detect predators (Gandhi and Cecala 2016). It was found in a study that even with the presence black bellied salamander predators (visually or detected by scent), the use of rocks for cover was not utilized by adults (Sever 1920).

Prey Items

	Adult Blue Ridge two-lined salamander primary diet consists of terrestrial organisms such as non insect arthropods, worms, and marine invertebrates. The larvae will feed primarily on aquatic macroinvertebrates and some terrestrial insects (Johnson and Wallace 2005).

Behavior

To avoid competition and predation, stream salamanders such as the Blue Ridge two-lined salamander will segregate spacelly within terrestrial habitats. In a study on, Trade-off between Desiccation and Predation Risk, the Blue Ridge Two-lined occurred between 15- 20 m from the stream edge risking desiccation because the environment is less suitable due to drier environmental conditions rather than posible predation (Crawford 2016). Most of the competition is based on their size.

References
Notes

Sources

Amphibians of the United States
Eurycea
Taxonomy articles created by Polbot
Amphibians described in 1920
Crawford, John A. “Trade-off between Desiccation and Predation Risk in the Blue Ridge Two-Lined Salamander (Eurycea Wilderae).” Copeia, vol. 104, no. 1, [American Society of Ichthyologists and Herpetologists (ASIH), Allen Press], 2016, pp. 21–25, http://www.jstor.org/stable/44972594.
Gandhi, Jaina S., and Kristen K. Cecala. “Interactive Effects of Temperature and Glyphosate on the Behavior of Blue Ridge Two-Lined Salamanders (Eurycea Wilderae).” Environmental Toxicology and Chemistry, vol. 35, no. 9, 2016, pp. 2297–2303., https://doi.org/10.1002/etc.3398. 
Sever, David M. Eurycea Wilderae Dunn, 1920 e Blue Ridge Two Lined Salamander D. 1920, https://www2.southeastern.edu/Academics/Faculty/dsever/Sever_2005_Ewilderae.pdf. 
 Brent R Johnson and J Bruce Wallace. Bottom-up limitation of a stream salamander in a detritus-based food web. Canadian Journal of Fisheries and Aquatic Sciences. 62(2): 301-311. https://doi.org/10.1139/f04-197